Franz Mathias Wasner (December 28, 1905 – June 21, 1992) was an Austrian Roman Catholic priest, the director and conductor of the Trapp Family Singers, and a missionary.  In the quasi-fictionalized stage and screen musical The Sound of Music, he is represented by the character Max Detweiler.

Biography
Wasner was born on December 28, 1905, in Feldkirchen near Mattighofen, a small town in Upper Austria.
After graduating from the University of Innsbruck, he was ordained a priest and served in the small rural community of Mayrhofen in Tyrol for one year. He studied ecclesiastical law in Rome and graduated in 1934.

Father Wasner returned to Salzburg where he met Georg von Trapp. He and Trapp became close friends, and from that time on he accompanied the Trapp family as director and conductor on all their concert tours. He also composed several Masses and more than 60 songs to texts by various poets such as Ingeborg Bachmann, Christian Morgenstern, and  Georg Trakl.

In 1958 Wasner decided to do missionary work on the Fiji Islands until 1966. During his stay, he commissioned murals in the small church of his station in Naiserelangi by the French artist Jean Charlot.

The Vatican appointed him in 1967 rector of the Pontifical Institute Santa Maria dell' Anima in Rome, which he headed until 1981.

He died on June 21, 1992 in Salzburg.

References

1905 births
1992 deaths
Austrian Roman Catholic missionaries
20th-century Austrian Roman Catholic priests
Trapp family
Male conductors (music)
Musical theatre characters
Roman Catholic missionaries in Fiji
20th-century Austrian conductors (music)
20th-century Austrian male musicians
Austrian expatriates in Fiji